Jean Joseph Nicolas Guillaume Lekeu (20 January 1870 – 21 January 1894) was a Belgian composer.

Life
Lekeu was born in Heusy, a village near Verviers, Belgium. He originally studied piano and music theory under Alphonse Voss, the director of the brass band at the local conservatory. In 1879, his parents moved to Poitiers, France. He continued to pursue his music studies independently while at school, composing his first piece at the age of 15. From 1885 onwards, he regularly composed new music, especially chamber music, and studied harmony and violin from 1887 under Octave Grisard.

In June 1888, his family moved to Paris where he began to study philosophy. He was introduced to the works of Téodor de Wyzewa and continued his studies under Gaston Vallin. In August 1889, he traveled to Bayreuth to see the operas of Richard Wagner. On his return, he studied counterpoint and fugue privately with César Franck. Franck encouraged him to continue composing; after Franck's death in the autumn of 1890, Wyzewa introduced him to Vincent d'Indy, who taught him orchestration and encouraged him to compete for the Belgian Prix de Rome, awarded in Brussels. In 1891, he won second prize in the competition for the cantata Andromède.

In 1892, d'Indy introduced Lekeu to Octave Maus, then secretary of Brussels-based Le Cercle des XX. Eugène Ysaÿe commissioned a work from him, the Violin Sonata in G major, which premiered in March 1893, and is his most famous and most often recorded work.

Lekeu contracted typhoid fever from a contaminated sorbet in October 1893. He died in his parents' home in Angers on 21 January 1894, the day after his 24th birthday. On 26 January 1894, he was buried in a small cemetery in Heusy.

Musical style and influences
Lekeu's personal style was present in his earliest compositions. In 1887, he said "Bien plus, ce sera bizarre, détraqué, horrible, tout ce qu'on voudra; mais, du moins, ce sera original" ("Even more, it will be weird, mad, horrible, anything you like, but at least it will be original").

Lekeu's string quartets were inspired by Beethoven, and exposure to Wagner's operas at Bayreuth influenced his approaches to melody. He described this as "des mélodies de telle longueur qu'un seul exposé suffisait à parfaire ... un morceau de musique"
("melodies of such length that a single presentation was sufficient to complete ... a piece of music").

His primary influence was Franck. Many of his works are characterized by a certain melancholy: in his own words, "la joie [est] mille fois plus difficile à peindre que la souffrance" ("joy is a thousand times harder to paint than suffering").

His larger compositions are cyclic in structure; that is, themes in his works will often recur from movement to movement, something no doubt inherited from a long tradition of nineteenth-century European composers, as well as from many works of Franck and d'Indy. The recurring themes in the violin sonata have led some scholars to suggest that it was an inspiration for the Vinteuil Sonata, an imaginary work described by Marcel Proust in In Search of Lost Time. However, the structure imagined by Proust is also similar to the violin sonata by Franck.

His style, prophetic of early-twentieth-century avant-garde French composers like Satie and Milhaud, was influenced by Franck, Wagner and (especially in the Trio) Beethoven, though these influences did not manifest themselves as mere imitation. In general, Lekeu is regarded as a highly talented composer whose death cut short a promising musical career.

Compositions

Lekeu composed about 50 works, and left a number of unfinished compositions at the time of his death. Two of these, a Cello Sonata and his Piano Quartet, were completed by d'Indy. All have been recorded at least once, and several of them more than once, notably the Violin Sonata in G Major and the Piano Trio in C minor. The first time Piano Sonata in G minor had been completely performed on live by pianist Paweł Albiński in Kraków, Poland on 20 August 2014.

Significant works

Choral
 Chant lyrique, for chorus & orchestra (poem by Lamartine) (1891)
 Andromède. Poème lyrique et symphonique, cantata (in 2 acts) for soprano, tenor, baritone, and bass soloists, chorus, and orchestra (text by Jules Sauvenière) (1891)

Songs
 Two poems of Lamartine, for voice & piano (1887)
 La Fenêtre de la maison paternelle
 Les Pavots
 Two songs with words by Lekeu, for voice & piano (1889)
 Quelque antique et lente danse
 L'ombre plus dense
 Chanson de Mai, song for voice & piano (text by Jean Lekeu) (1891)
 Plainte d'Andromède, for soprano & piano sextet (string quartet and doublebass) (1892)
 Trois Poèmes, for voice & piano (also arr. for unaccompanied soprano) (words by Lekeu) (1892)
 Sur une tombe
 Ronde
 Nocturne (also arr. for mezzo-soprano & piano quintet)

Orchestra
 Introduction symphonique aux Burgraves (Overture after Victor Hugo's Les Burgraves) (2 mvts), for orchestra (1889)
 Barberine, Prélude (Prélude au 2e acte) (Prelude to Act II of the opera Barberine), for orchestra (1889)
 Chant de triomphale délivrance, Étude symphonique (Première Étude symphonique), for orchestra (1889–90)
 Hamlet. Étude symphonique (Deuxième Étude symphonique) (Hamlet et Ophélie), for orchestra (2 mvts) (1890)
 I. Hamlet
 II. Ophélie
 Les Fleurs pâles du souvenir, Adagio pour quatuor d'orchestre, for string orchestra (with violin solo) (1891)
 Fantaisie sur deux airs populaires angevins (Fantasy on two Angers folktunes), for orchestra (also for piano 4-hands) (1892)

Concertante and ensemble works
 Fantaisie contrapuntique sur un cramignon liégeois (Contrapuntal fantasy on the Liège Cramignon), for chamber orchestra (with choreography for the individual musicians) (1890)
 Épithalame, for organ & string orchestra (with 3 trombones) (1891)
 Larghetto, for cello & string orchestra (with 2 horns & bassoon) (1892)
 Introduction et Adagio pour tuba et orchestre d'harmonie (tuba & wind orchestra) (1892)

Chamber music
 Quatuor (String Quartet) in G major, (in 6 mvts) (1888)
 Sonate (Cello Sonata) in F major (in 4 descriptive mvts) (1888)
 Trio pour piano, violon et violoncelle (Trio à clavier) (Piano Trio) in C minor (in 4 mvts) (1889–91)
 Sonate pour piano et violon (Violin Sonata) in G major (in 3 mvts) (1892–93)
 Quatuor a clavier (Piano Quartet) in B minor (2 mvts) (1892–94)

Piano
 Berceuse et Valse (Pot-pourri), for piano (1887)
 Morceaux égoïstes, for piano (7 pieces) (1887–88)
 Morceau (a fantasia on a Cramignon or Walloon folk dance melody), for piano 4-hands (1889)
 Sonate (Piano Sonata) in G minor (in 5 mvts) (1891)
 3 Pièces, for piano (1892)
 Chansonette sans paroles
 Valse oubliée
 Danse joyeuse

References

External links
 
 
 Koninklijk Conservatorium Brussel now houses most works and manuscripts of Lekeu, after the bankruptcy of CeBeDeM in 2015.

1870 births
1894 deaths
19th-century classical composers
19th-century Belgian male musicians
Belgian classical composers
Belgian male classical composers
Concert band composers
Deaths from typhoid fever
Infectious disease deaths in France
People from Verviers
Prix de Rome (Belgium) winners
Pupils of César Franck
Romantic composers
Walloon people